Invictus is a 2009 biographical sports film directed by Clint Eastwood and starring Morgan Freeman and Matt Damon, making it the third collaboration between Eastwood and Freeman after Unforgiven (1992) and Million Dollar Baby (2004). The story is based on the 2008 John Carlin book Playing the Enemy: Nelson Mandela and the Game That Made a Nation about the events in South Africa before and during the 1995 Rugby World Cup. The Springboks were not expected to perform well, the team having only recently returned to high-level international competition following the dismantling of apartheid—the country was hosting the World Cup, thus earning an automatic entry. Freeman portrays South African President Nelson Mandela while Damon played François Pienaar, the captain of the Springboks, the South Africa rugby union team.

Invictus was released in the United States on December 11, 2009. The title refers to the Roman divine epithet Invictus and may be translated from the Latin as "undefeated" or "unconquered". "Invictus" is also the title of a poem, referred to in the film, by British poet William Ernest Henley (1849–1903). The film was met with positive critical reviews and earned Academy Award nominations for Freeman (Best Actor) and Damon (Best Supporting Actor). The film grossed $122.2 million on a budget of $50–60 million.

Plot
On 11 February 1990, Nelson Mandela is released from Victor Verster Prison after having spent 27 years in captivity. Four years later, Mandela is elected the first black President of South Africa. His presidency faces enormous challenges in the post-Apartheid era, including rampant poverty and crime, and Mandela is particularly concerned about racial divisions between black and white South Africans, which would lead to violence. The ill will which both groups hold towards each other is seen even in his own security detail where relations between the established white officers, who had guarded Mandela's predecessors, and the black ANC additions to the security detail, are frosty and marked by mutual distrust.

While attending a game between the Springboks, the country's rugby union team, and England, Mandela recognises that some black people in the stadium are cheering for England, and not their own country, as the mostly-white Springboks represent prejudice and apartheid in their minds; he remarks that he did the same while imprisoned on Robben Island. Knowing that South Africa is set to host the 1995 Rugby World Cup in one year's time, Mandela persuades a meeting of the newly black-dominated South African Sports Committee to support the Springboks. He then meets with the captain of the Springboks rugby team, François Pienaar (Matt Damon), and implies that a Springboks victory in the World Cup will unite and inspire the nation. Mandela also shares with François a British poem, "Invictus", that had inspired him during his time in prison.

François and his teammates train. Many South Africans, both black and white, doubt that rugby will unite a nation torn apart by nearly 50 years of racial tensions, as for many black people, especially the radicals, the Springboks symbolise white supremacy. Both Mandela and Pienaar, however, stand firmly behind their theory that the game can successfully unite the South African country.

Things begin to change as the players interact with the fans and begin a friendship with them. During the opening games, support for the Springboks begins to grow among the black population. By the second game, the whole country comes together to support the Springboks and Mandela's efforts. Mandela's security team also grows closer as the racially diverse officers come to respect their comrades' professionalism and dedication.

As Mandela watches, the Springboks defeat one of their arch-rivals—Australia, the defending champions and known as the Wallabies—in their opening match. They then continue to defy all expectations and, as Mandela conducts trade negotiations in Taiwan, defeat France in heavy rain to advance to the final against their other arch-rival: New Zealand, known as the All Blacks. New Zealand and South Africa were universally regarded as the two greatest rugby nations, with the Springboks then the only side to have a winning record (20–19–2) against the All Blacks, since their first meeting in 1921.

Meanwhile one day during the tournament, the Springbok team visited Robben Island, where Mandela spent the first 18 of his 27 years in jail. There, Pienaar is inspired by Mandela's will and his idea of self-mastery in "Invictus". François mentions his amazement that Mandela "could spend thirty years in a tiny cell, and come out ready to forgive the people who put him there".

Supported by a large home crowd of all races at Ellis Park Stadium in Johannesburg, Pienaar motivates his teammates for the final. Mandela's security detail receives a scare when, just before the match, a South African Airways Boeing 747-200 jetliner flies in low over the stadium. However, it is not an assassination attempt, but a demonstration of patriotism, with the message "Good Luck, Bokke"—the Springboks' Afrikaans nickname—painted on the undersides of the plane's wings. Mandela also famously arrives onto the field before the match wearing a Springbok cap and a replica of Pienaar's #6 jersey.

The Springboks complete their run by beating the All Blacks 15–12 in extra time, thanks to a drop goal from fly-half Joel Stransky. Mandela and Pienaar meet on the field together to celebrate the improbable and unexpected victory, and Mandela hands Pienaar the William Webb Ellis Cup, as the Springboks are now indeed rugby union's world champions. Mandela's car then drives away in the traffic-jammed streets leaving the stadium. He insists that there is no hurry as his security team wanted to change the route due to the cheering crowd. As Mandela watches South Africans celebrating together in the street from his car, his voice is heard reciting "Invictus" again.

Cast
 Morgan Freeman as Nelson Mandela, the head of the African National Congress, who has become the first black President of South Africa
 Matt Damon as François Pienaar, the Springboks' captain and openside flanker
 Tony Kgoroge as Jason Tshabalala
 Adjoa Andoh as Brenda Mazibuko
 Julian Lewis Jones as Etienne Feyder
 Patrick Mofokeng as Linga Moonsamy
 Matt Stern as Hendrick Booyens
 Marguerite Wheatley as Nerine Winter, Pienaar's wife
 Patrick Lyster as François Pienaar's father
 Leleti Khumalo as Mary
 McNeil Hendricks as Chester Williams, the Springboks' left wing and the only black player on the team
 Scott Eastwood as Joel Stransky, the Springboks' fly half and goal kicker
 Zak Feaunati as Jonah Lomu, the All Blacks' left wing, considered the best player in the world
 Grant L. Roberts as Ruben Kruger, the Springboks' blindside flanker
 Rolf E. Fitschen as Naka Drotské, the Springboks' reserve hooker
 Vaughn Thompson as Rudolf Straeuli, the Springboks' reserve flanker
 Robin B. Smith as Johan de Villiers, sport commentator
 Charl Engelbrecht as Garry Pagel, the Springboks' reserve prop
 Graham Lindemann as Kobus Wiese, the Springboks' number 4 lock
 Louis Minnaar as Springbok coach
 Sean Cameron Michael as Springbok equipment manager
 Danny Keogh as Louis Luyt
 Bonnie Henna as Zindzi Mandela-Hlongwane
 Kgosi Mongake as Sipho
 David Dukas as the pilot of the Boeing 747 who flew low over Ellis Park Stadium just prior to the appearance of Mandela on the field before the game started
 Hennie Bosman as a racist rugby coach

Production
The film is based on the book Playing the Enemy: Mandela and the Game that Made a Nation by John Carlin. The filmmakers met with Carlin for a week in his Barcelona home, discussing how to transform the book into a screenplay. Filming began in March 2009 in Cape Town. Primary filming in South Africa was completed in May 2009.

Morgan Freeman was the first actor to be cast, as Mandela. Matt Damon was then cast as team captain François, despite being significantly smaller than him and much smaller than members of the current Springbok squad.
He was given intensive coaching by Chester Williams, another star of the 1995 team, at the Gardens Rugby League Club. "In terms of stature and stars, this certainly is one of the biggest films ever to be made in South Africa," said Laurence Mitchell, the head of the Cape Film Commission. On March 18, 2009, Scott Eastwood was cast as flyhalf Joel Stransky (whose drop goal provided the Springboks' winning margin in the 1995 final).
Over Christmas 2008, auditions had taken place in London to try to find a well-known British actor to play Pienaar's father, but in March it was decided to cast a lesser-known South African actor instead.
Zak Fe'aunati, who had previously played professionally for Bath, was cast as Jonah Lomu, while Grant L. Roberts was cast as Ruben Kruger, who was the Springboks' other starting flanker in 1995. Chester Williams was also involved with the project to teach rugby to those of the cast playing players who had not played it before, while Freeman and Williams also became involved with the ESPN 30 For 30 film The 16th Man. Filming of the final also took place on location at Ellis Park Stadium, the actual venue for the 1995 final.

Release
Invictus opened in 2,125 theaters in North America at #3 with US$8,611,147 and was the largest opening for a rugby-themed film. The film held well and ultimately earned $37,491,364 domestically and $84,742,607 internationally for a total of $122,233,971, above its $60 million budget.

Home media
The film was released on May 18, 2010 on DVD and Blu-ray Disc. Special features include
 Matt Damon Plays Rugby
 Invictus music trailer
The Blu-ray release included a digital copy and additional special features:
 Vision, Courage and Honor: Diplo and the Power of a True Story
 Mandela Meets Morgan
 The SmoothieWolf Factor documentary excerpts
 Picture-in-Picture exploration with cast, crew and the real people who lived this true story

Reception
The film was met with generally positive reviews. Review aggregate Rotten Tomatoes reports that 76% of critics have given the film a positive review based on 246 reviews, with an average score of 6.60/10. The website's critical consensus is: "Delivered with typically stately precision from director Clint Eastwood, Invictus may not be rousing enough for some viewers, but Matt Damon and Morgan Freeman inhabit their real-life characters with admirable conviction." On Metacritic, the film has a weighted average score of 74 out of 100, based on 34 critics, indicating "generally favorable reviews".

Critic David Ansen wrote:

Anthony Peckham's sturdy, functional screenplay, based on John Carlin's book Playing the Enemy, can be a bit on the nose (and the message songs Eastwood adds are overkill). Yet the lapses fade in the face of such a soul-stirring story—one that would be hard to believe if it were fiction. The wonder of Invictus is that it actually went down this way.

Roger Ebert of the Chicago Sun-Times gave the film three-and-a-half stars and wrote:

It is a very good film. It has moments evoking great emotion, as when the black and white members of the presidential security detail (hard-line ANC activists and Afrikaner cops) agree with excruciating difficulty to serve together. And when Damon's character—François Pienaar, as the team captain—is shown the cell where Mandela was held for those long years on Robben Island. My wife, Chaz, and I were taken to the island early one morning by Ahmed Kathrada, one of Mandela's fellow prisoners, and yes, the movie shows his very cell, with the thin blankets on the floor. You regard that cell and you think, here a great man waited in faith for his rendezvous with history.

Shave Magazines Jake Tomlinson wrote:

Eastwood's film shows how sport can unify people, a straightforward and moving message that leaves audiences cheering. The sports, accurate portrayal and the solid storyline earn this movie a manliness rating of 3/5. However, the entertainment value, historical accuracy and strong message this movie delivers earn it an overall rating of 4.5 stars. Definitely, worth seeing.

Variety's Todd McCarthy wrote:

Inspirational on the face of it, Clint Eastwood's film has a predictable trajectory, but every scene brims with surprising details that accumulate into a rich fabric of history, cultural impressions and emotion.

Awards and honors

Soundtrack
 "9000 days" – Overtone with Yollandi Nortjie
 "Invictus Theme" – Kyle Eastwood and Michael Stevens
 "Colorblind" – Overtone
 "Siyalinda" – Kyle Eastwood and Michael Stevens
 "World in Union 95" – Overtone with Yollande Nortjie
 "Madiba's theme" – Kyle Eastwood and Michael Stevens
 "Hamba Nathi" – Overtone with Yollande Nortjie
 "Thanda" – Kyle Eastwood and Michael Stevens
 "Shosholoza" – Overtone with Yollande Nortjie
 "Inkathi" – Kyle Eastwood and Michael Stevens
 "Ole Ole Ole—We Are The Champions" – Overtone with Yollandi Nortjie
 "Enqena (Anxious)" – Kyle Eastwood and Michael Stevens
The South African National Anthem – Overtone
 "Ukunqoba (To Conquer)" – Kyle Eastwood and Michael Stevens
 "Victory" – Soweto String Quartet
 "Xolela (Forgiveness)" – Kyle Eastwood and Michael Stevens
 "The Crossing (Osiyeza)" – Overtone with Yollandi Nortjie
 "9,000 days (acoustic)" – Emile Welman

See also

 List of American films of 2009
 Politics and sports
 English-language accents in film – South African

References

External links

 
 
 
 
 
 
 

2009 action films
2009 biographical drama films
2000s sports films
2009 films
Apartheid films
English-language South African films
Films directed by Clint Eastwood
Films produced by Clint Eastwood
Films produced by Robert Lorenz
Films produced by Mace Neufeld
Films set in 1990
Films set in 1994
Films set in 1995
Films set in South Africa
Films shot in South Africa
Malpaso Productions films
Films about Nelson Mandela
Cultural depictions of Nelson Mandela
Cultural depictions of South African men
Cultural depictions of rugby footballers
Rugby union films
History of rugby union matches between New Zealand and South Africa
Sports films based on actual events
Spyglass Entertainment films
Warner Bros. films
American biographical drama films
South African biographical drama films
Zulu-language films
Afrikaans-language films
Xhosa-language films
Rugby union and apartheid
New Zealand at the 1995 Rugby World Cup
South Africa at the 1995 Rugby World Cup
1995 Rugby World Cup
2009 drama films
2000s American films